Curt Skotnicki is a former American football coach.  He served as the head football coach at Jamestown College—now known as the University of Jamestown—in Jamestown, North Dakota, for four seasons, from 2000 until 2003, compiling a record of 17–23.

Head coaching record

References

Year of birth missing (living people)
Living people
Jamestown Jimmies football coaches
William Jewell Cardinals football coaches